The Dutch Eredivisie in the 1996–97 season was contested by 18 teams. PSV won the championship.

League standings

Results

Promotion/relegation play-offs

See also
 1996–97 Eerste Divisie
 1996–97 KNVB Cup

References

External links
 Results by round at weltfussball.de

Eredivisie seasons
Netherlands
1996–97 in Dutch football